Bem-Vinda Vontade (Portuguese for "welcome, desire") is the sixth studio album by Mice Parade. It was released on April 19, 2005, by Bubblecore Records and FatCat Records. It contains vocals by Kristín Anna Valtýsdóttir of Múm and Ikuko Harada of Clammbon.

Track listing

Personnel
 Adam Pierce: drums, guitar, voice, percussion, synthesizer, rhodes piano, pianet, gamelan, cajon, dulcimer
 Dan Lippel: guitar
 Dylan Cristy: vibraphone
 Rob King: pianet, synthesizer
 Doug Scharin: drums, realtime digital effects on "The Days before Fiction"
 Brandon Knights: realtime analog effects on "The Days before Fiction"
 Ikuko Harada: voice on "Ground As Cold As Common"
 Kristín Anna Valtýsdóttir: accordion, voice on "Nights Wave" and "The Boat Room"
 Doro Tachler: synthesizer, voice on "The Days before Fiction"
 Rob Laakso: electric guitar on "Steady As She Goes"
 Josh Larue: additional guitar on "Nights Wave"
 Marc Wolf: additional guitar on "Nights Wave" and "Waterslide"

References

External links
 
 Bem-Vinda Vontade at FatCat Records

2005 albums
Mice Parade albums
FatCat Records albums